FK Balkan Mirijevo  is a Serbian football club.

History
In the seasons 1941–42 and 1942–43 Balkan played in the Serbian League which was the top national tier of the German-occupied Serbia during World War Two, finishing 10th and 8th respectively.  Their main players in this period were former BSK Belgrade players Dragutin Najdanović, Rajko Pašanski and Miloš Šijačić.

Recent seasons
1926/27 III razred 10th place
1927/28 III razred grupa Vardar 1st place
1928/29 II razred grupa Drava 4th place
1929/30 II razred grupa Drava 6th place
1930/31 II razred grupa Drava 6th place
1931/32 II razred grupa Drava 3rd place
1932/33 I B razred 7th place
1933/34 I B razred 10th place
1934/35 I B razred 8th place
1935/36 I B razred 5th place
1936/37 I B razred 8th place
1937/38 I B razred 2nd place
1938/39 I A razred 10th place
1939/40 I A razred 2nd place
1940/41 I A razred 1st place
1958/59 III C razred 5th place
1959/60 III C razred 3rd place
1960/61 II C razred 4th place
1961/62 II C razred 1st place
1962/63 I B razred 5th place
1963/64 I D razred 3rd place
1964/65 II B beogradska liga 11th place
1965/66 II B beogradska liga 12th place
1966/67 III C beogradska liga 1st place
1967/68 II B beogradska liga 8th place
1968/69 II B beogradska liga 12th place
1969/70 II B beogradska liga 14th place
1970/71 III A beogradska liga 9th place
1971/72 III A beogradska liga 10th place
1972/73 III A beogradska liga 7th place
1973/74 III D beogradska liga 4th place
1974/75 III D beogradska liga 2nd place
1975/76 II A beogradska liga 5th place
1976/77 II A beogradska liga 2nd place
1977/78 I A beogradska liga 9th place
1978/79 I A beogradska liga 13th place
1979/80 I A beogradska liga 10th place
1980/81 I A beogradska liga 8th place
1981/82 II beogradska liga 9th place
1982/83 II beogradska liga 7th place
1983/84 II beogradska liga 1st place
1984/85 II beogradska liga 6th place
1985/86 II beogradska liga 5th place
1986/87 I beogradska liga Dunav 13th place
1987/88 I beogradska liga Dunav 8th place
1988/89 I beogradska liga Dunav 3rd place
1989/90 I beogradska liga Dunav 6th place
1990/91 I beogradska liga 5th place
1991/92 I A beogradska liga 3rd place
1992/93 I A beogradska liga 4th place
1993/94 beogradska zona 2nd place
1994/95 republicka zona Beograd 8th place
1995/96 Srpska liga Beograd 3rd place
1996/97 Druga A savezna liga 11th place
1997/98 Druga savezna liga	14th place
1998/99 Srpska liga Beograd 4th place

Fans
The club has a group of very loyal fans nicknamed Šumari.

References

External links
FK Balkan page FB 

Association football clubs established in 1926
Football clubs in Belgrade
1926 establishments in Serbia
Zvezdara